Hoffman is a surname of German  origin. The original meaning in medieval times was "steward", i.e. one who manages the property of another. In English and other European languages, including Yiddish and Dutch, the name can also be spelled Hoffmann, Hofmann, Hofman, Huffman, Hofmans.

People with the surname

A
 Aaron Hoffman (1880–1944), American writer, director and comedian
 Abbie Hoffman (1936–1989), American social activist of prominence in the 1960s and 1970s
 Abraham Hoffman (1938–2015), Israeli basketball player
 Adolph Hoffmann (1858-1930), German politician and Prussian Minister for Science, Culture and Education
 Al Hoffman (1902–1960), Russian-born American songwriter
 Alan Hoffman (born 1982), American entrepreneur
 Albert Hofmann (1906–2008), Swiss chemist and discoverer of LSD
 Alex Hoffman-Ellis (born 1989), American football player
 Alice Hoffman (born 1952), American author
 Anthony Hoffman (1739–1790), New York politician
 Arthur Sullivant Hoffman (1876–1966), American magazine editor
 August Wilhelm von Hofmann (1818-1892) German organic chemist

B
 Barbara Hoffman (born 1931), All-American Girls Professional Baseball League player
 Beate Hofmann (born 1963), German Lutheran bishop
 Ben Hoffman (born 1974), American comedian and writer
 Ben Hoffman (triathlete) (born 1983), American triathlete
 Benjamin Hoffman (1864–1922), American lawyer, politician, and judge
 Benzion Hoffman  best known by the pen name Zivion, Yiddish writer, journalist, and political activist
 Bern Hoffman (1913–1979), American film and television actor
 Bernard Hoffman (1913–1979), American photographer
 Biff Hoffman (1904–1954), American football player
 Bill Hoffman (disambiguation), several people
 Brock Hoffman (born 1998), American football player

C
 Calvin Hoffman (died 1987), American theater press agent and writer
 Camille Hoffman (born 1987), American artist
 Carl von Hoffman (1889–1982), Russian adventurer
 Carl Henry Hoffman (1896–1980), Pennsylvania politician
 Charles Hoffman (1911–1972), American screenwriter and film producer
 Charles E. Hoffman (born 1949), American business executive and college dean
 Charles Fenno Hoffman (1806–1884), American author, poet and editor
 Charlotta Hoffman (1807–1877) Swedish actress
 Christopher Hoffman (born 1981), Zimbabwean actor and voice artist
 Clare Hoffman (1875–1967), American politician

D
 Daniel Hoffman (1923–2013), American poet, essayist, and academic
 Danny Hoffman (1880–1922), American baseball player
David Hoffman (disambiguation), several people
 Darleane C. Hoffman (born 1926), American nuclear chemist
 Donald D. Hoffman (born 1955), American cognitive psychologist and popular science author
 Dorothea Hoffman (died 1710), Swedish hat maker 
 Dorothy Hoffman (1915–1996), American engineer
 Doug Hoffman (born 1953), politician, congressional candidate
 Dustin Hoffman (born 1937), American actor and film director
 Dutch Hoffman (1904–1962), American baseball player

E
 E. T. A. Hoffmann (1776–1822), Ernst Theodor Amadeus Hoffmann, German Romantic author of fantasy and Gothic horror
 Edward George Hoffman (1877–1931), American politician
 Edward J. Hoffman (1942–2004), American professor, co-inventor of the PET scanner
 Elaine Hoffman Watts (1932–2017), American klezmer drummer
 Elisha Hoffman (1839–1929), American hymn composer
 Elmer J. Hoffman (1899–1976), American politician
 Emily Hoffman (1876-1927), American socialite
 Ernst Reinhold von Hofmann (1801–1871), Russian geologist and mineralogist
 Eugene Augustus Hoffman (1829–1902), American clergyman

F
 F. Burrall Hoffman (1882–1980), American architect
 Fabian Hoffman (1917–1980), American football player
 François-Benoît Hoffman (1760–1828), French playwright and critic
 Frederick Ludwig Hoffman (1865–1946), American statistician

G
 Gene L. Hoffman (1932–2007), American educator and politician
 George H. Hoffman (1838–1922), South Dakota politician
 Glenn Hoffman (born 1958), American baseball player, coach, and manager
 Grace Hoffman (1921–2008), American operatic mezzo-soprano and academic teacher
 Gregory Hofmann (born 1992), Swiss ice hockey player

H
 H. Lawrence Hoffman (1911–1977), American illustrator
 Harold G. Hoffman (1896–1954), American politician and governor of New Jersey
 Heinrich Hoffman (1836–1894), American Civil War Corporal in the Union Army
 Heinrich Hoffmann (photographer) (1885–1957), Hitler's personal photographer and Nazi politician
 Henry William Hoffman (1825–1895), American politician

I
 Irwin Hoffman (1924–2018), North American and Latin American Conductor
Izzy Hoffman (1875–1942), American baseball player

J
 Jack Hoffman (born 2005), American pediatric cancer patient
 Jack Hoffman (American football) (1930–2001), American football player
 Jackie Hoffman (born 1960), American actress and stand-up comedian
 Jacob Hoffman (1881–1956), Hungarian rabbi
 Jacob Hoffman (musician) (died 1974), American xylophone player
 Jan Hoffmann (born 1955), German figure skater
 Janice Hoffman, birth name of Janice H. Levin (1913–2001), philanthropist and art collector from New York City
 Jason Hoffman (born 1989), Australian football (soccer) player
 Jay Hoffman (rugby league) (born 1958), Australian rugby league footballer
 Jean Hoffman (water polo) (1893–?), Belgian water polo player
 Jeff Hoffman (born 1993), American baseball player
 Jeffrey A. Hoffman (born 1944), American astronaut
 Jerzy Hoffman (born 1932), Polish film director and screenwriter
 John Hoffman (filmmaker) (1904–1980), Hungarian-American filmmaker
 John T. Hoffman (1828–1888), governor of New York state and mayor of New York City
 Josef Hofmann (1876–1954), Polish-American pianist, composer, music teacher, and inventor
 Josef Anton Hofmann (1924–2010), London-born American audio engineer, son of Josef Hofmann
 Josh Hoffman (born 1988), Australian Rugby League player
 Josiah Ogden Hoffman (1766–1837), New York State Attorney General 1795–1802
 Josias Philip Hoffman (1807–1879), Boer politician and first President of the Orange Free State
 Julius Hoffman (1895–1983), presiding judge in the Chicago Eight trial

K
 Karla Hoffman, American operations researcher
 Katherine B. Hoffman (1914–2020), American chemist and academic administrator
Klaus H. Hofmann (1911–1995), American chemist
 Klementyna Hoffmanowa (1798–1845), Polish writer and translator

L
 Larry Hoffman (1878–1948), American baseball player
 Lauren Hoffman (born 1977), American singer
 Lyman Hoffman (born 1950), member of the Alaska Senate

M
 Malvina Hoffman (1887–1966), American sculptor and author
 Mani Hoffman (born 1975), French singer and songwriter
 Manny Hoffman (1937–2013), American politician and businessman
 Marc Hoffman (born 1961), American composer
 Mark González Hoffman (born 1984), Chilean footballer
 Mat Hoffman (born 1972), American BMX rider
 Matthew Hoffman (murderer) (born 1980), American triple murderer
 Max Hoffman (1904–1981), Austrian-born importer of European automobiles into the United States
 Melchior Hoffman (c. 1490 – 1543), 16th-century German religious leader
 Michael Hoffman (director) (born 1956), American movie director
 Michael A. Hoffman (1944–1990), American archaeologist
 Michael A. Hoffman II (born 1954), American Holocaust denier
 Mike Hoffman (born 1989), Canadian ice hockey player
 Myer Hoffman (1902–1959), English-born Irish cricketer
 Myn M. Hoffman (1883–1951), American military nurse

N
 Nadine Hoffman, All-American Girls Professional Baseball League player
 Nanna Hoffman (1846–1920), Swedish entrepreneur
 Nicholas von Hoffman (1929–2018), American journalist
 Nina Kiriki Hoffman (born 1955), American fantasy author
 Noah Hoffman (born 1989), American Olympic skier

O
 Ogden Hoffman (1794–1856), New York State Attorney General 1854–1855
 Ogden Hoffman Jr. (1822–1891), American federal judge
 Otto Hoffman (1879–1944), American film actor

P
 Paul Hoffman (basketball) (1925–1998), American basketball player
 Paul G. Hoffman (1891–1974), American automobile company executive
 Philip Hoffman (disambiguation), several people

R
 Rachel Hoffman (1984–2008), American student, murder victim in botched drug sting
 Reid Hoffman (born 1967), American entrepreneur
 Richard Hoffman (disambiguation), several people
 Rick Hoffman, American actor
 Robert Hoffman (disambiguation), several people

S
 Samuel Hoffman (1903–1967), American thereminist
 Steve Hoffman (disambiguation), several people

T
 Tex Hoffman (1893–1947), American baseball player
 Thom Hoffman (born 1957), Dutch actor and photographer
 Toni Hoffman, Australian nurse and whistleblower
 Trevor Hoffman (born 1967), Major League Baseball pitcher
 Tristan Hoffman (born 1970), Dutch road racing cyclist

W
 William Hoffman (disambiguation), several people

German-language surnames
Occupational surnames
Yiddish-language surnames
Jewish surnames